Heliozela hammoniella is a moth of the Heliozelidae family. It is found in Ireland, Great Britain, the Netherlands, France, Germany, Austria, the Czech Republic, Poland, Romania, Lithuania, Latvia, Fennoscandia, and Russia.

The wingspan is 5–7 mm. Differs from Heliozela resplendella as follows : forewings less bronzy-tinged, termen less oblique.

Adults are on wing in May and June.

The larvae feed on Betula pubescens. Young larvae bore in the pith of a twig of their host plant. When almost fully grown, it enters a petiole and then the midrib of a leaf. From the midrib, a short full depth corridor is made which runs into the blade. This corridor is usually quite short. Finally, an oval excision is made, which the larvae uses to vacate the mine and drop to the ground. Larvae can be found from July to August.

References

Moths described in 1885
Heliozelidae
Moths of Europe